The cabinet of Barbu Catargiu was the first government of the United Principalities of Romania, after formal union of Wallachia with Moldavia, and lasted from 22 January to 24 June 1862. Prime Minister Barbu Catargiu was assassinated on 20 June and the government collapsed soon thereafter.

Ministers
The ministers of the cabinet were as follows:

President of the Council of Ministers:

Barbu Catargiu (22 January - 20 June 1862)
(interim) Apostol Arsache (20 - 24 June 1862)
Minister of the Interior: 
Barbu Catargiu (22 January - 20 June 1862)
(interim) Apostol Arsache (20 - 24 June 1862)
Minister of Foreign Affairs: 
Apostol Arsache (22 January - 24 June 1862)
Minister of Finance:
Alexandru C. Moruzi (22 - 27 January 1862)
Grigore Balș (27 January - 11 March 1862)
Alexandru Catargiu (11 - 24 March 1862)
 (24 March - 24 June 1862)
Minister of Justice:
Constantin N. Brăiloiu (22 January - 7 June 1862)
Dimitrie Cornea (7 - 24 June 1862)
Minister of Religious Affairs:
Grigore Balș (22 January - 7 February 1862)
Barbu Bellu (7 February - 24 June 1862)
Minister of War:5
Gen. Ioan G. Ghica (22 January - 24 June 1862)
Minister of Public Works:
(interim) Barbu Catargiu (22 - 27 January 1862)
Dimitrie Cornea (27 January - 7 June 1862)
(interim) Alexandru Em. Florescu (7 - 24 June 1862)
Minister of Control:
Alexandru Em. Florescu (24 March - 24 June 1862)

References

Cabinets of Romania
Cabinets established in 1862
Cabinets disestablished in 1862
1862 establishments in Romania
1862 disestablishments in Romania